Two original soundtrack albums were released for Jigoku Shōjo. The first album contains twenty-four tracks and was released on January 25, 2006 by Sony Music Entertainment under the catalog number SVWC-7331. The second album contains twenty-six tracks and was released on April 19, 2006 by Sony Music Entertainment under the catalog number SVWC-7348.

Two original soundtrack albums were released for Jigoku Shōjo Futakomori. The first album contains twenty-three tracks and was released on January 24, 2007 by Sony Music Entertainment under the catalog number SVWC-7440. The second album contains twenty-three tracks and was released on March 21, 2007 by Sony Music Entertainment under the catalog number SVWC-7454.

Two original soundtrack albums were released for Jigoku Shōjo: Mitsuganae. The first album contained twenty-eight tracks and was released on December 17, 2008 by Sony Music Entertainment under the catalog number SVWC-7597. The second album contained twenty-seven tracks and was released on March 4, 2009 by Sony Music Entertainment under the catalog number SVWC-7612.

Jigoku Shōjo Original Soundtrack

Jigoku Shōjo Original Soundtrack II

※ Track 21 is called by Noto Mamiko

Jigoku Shōjo Futakomori Original Soundtrack

Jigoku Shōjo Futakomori Original Soundtrack II

Jigoku Shōjo Mitsuganae Original Soundtrack ~Nikushoku~

Jigoku Shōjo Mitsuganae Original Soundtrack ~Soushoku~

References 

Anime soundtracks
Film and television discographies
Discographies of Japanese artists
Lists of soundtracks